The following is a partial list of former theatres in Boston, Massachusetts, United States. It includes multi-purpose public spaces that functioned at least in part as venues for theatrical performances, including vaudeville. Most venues also served at one time or another as concert halls, lecture halls, meeting spaces, etc. Some operated as dime museums, and some as motion picture houses. Some of the buildings that formerly housed theatres have survived to the present day. However, most of the buildings no longer exist.

Former theatres in Boston

References

Further reading

External links

 

 
 
Boston-related lists
Boston
Cultural history of Boston
Boston